Dr. Pritam Saini (1927–2003) was a Punjabi journalist, literary critic and history scholar. He served as Research Fellow at Punjabi University, Patiala in Punjab, India and was also a member of academic bodies such as the Punjab History Conference and Indian History Congress.

References

1927 births
2003 deaths
Punjabi-language writers
20th-century Indian journalists
Academic staff of Punjabi University
Journalists from Punjab, India